The discography of Argentine recording artist Duki consists of two studio album, one live albums, two extended plays and eighty-six singles (including thirty-seven as featured artist and fourteen promotional singles).
He has gained popularity with his singles "She Don't Give a FO", "Loca" and "Goteo", the latter reached the top 10 on the Billboard Argentina Hot 100. In November 2019, Duki released his debut studio album, Súper Sangre Joven. In February 2019, Duki appeared as featured artist on Bad Bunny's album track "Hablamos Mañana" from the Puerto Rican singer's second studio album YHLQMDLG.

On April 22, 2021, Duki released his second studio album Desde el Fin del Mundo, the album ranked number 1 in digital albums chart in Argentina and number 11 in the Spanish albums chart.

Albums

Studio albums

Live albums

Extended plays

Singles

As lead artist

As a featured artist

Promotional singles

Other charted songs

Other songs

Notes

References 

Discographies of Argentine artists
Hip hop discographies